Berlin-based Innovestment GmbH is one of the first crowdfunding platforms to be established in Germany (2011). By the end of 2017, 40 projects had been successfully implemented and a total capital of EUR 8 million brokered. Since the realignment of the company in 2019, small and medium-sized companies can raise capital on innovestment.eu in an uncomplicated and transparent manner. From this Innovestment develops broadly diversified investment projects with fixed terms and interest rates for private and institutional investors. Projects come from the fields of sustainability, innovative growth project financing and entrepreneurship. 

The company was founded in 2011 as a spin-off of RWTH Aachen University by Filipe da Costa, Daniel Appelhoff, Alexander Rajko and Norbert Töpker. Christin Friedrich joined as a managing partner in 2012 and is CEO since 2014. Her mission is to democratize capital for real economic progress.

See also
Comparison of crowd funding services
RWTH Aachen University

References 

Equity crowdfunding platforms
Crowdfunding platforms of Germany